Eximia is a genus of round-necked longhorn beetles of the subfamily Cerambycinae.

Species
 Eximia colorata (Quedenfeldt, 1882)
 Eximia finitima Schmidt, 1922
 Eximia sinuatocollis (Thomson, 1858)
 Eximia suturalis (Hintz, 1919)

Callichromatini